Joseph Duszak (born July 22, 1997) is an American professional ice hockey defenceman for HC Dinamo Minsk of the Kontinental Hockey League (KHL).

Playing career

Amateur
At the age of 15, Duszak joined the P.A.L. Junior Islanders of the United States Premier Hockey League (USPHL). During the 2014–15 season, Duszak committed to attend Mercyhurst University and play for the Mercyhurst Lakers Division 1 men's ice hockey team.

In his last season with the Junior Islanders, Duszak was named the 2016 USPHL Player of the Year after ending the 2015–16 year with 60 points. He was also named USPHL Premier Defenseman of the Year. Although he played two games for the Chicago Steel of the United States Hockey League, Duszak eventually returned to the USPHL.

In his freshman year at Mercyhurst, he played in 29 games and ended the season with 5 goals and 16 assists. In his sophomore season, Duszak tallied 9 goals and 22 assists in 35 games. At the end of the season, he was named to the Atlantic Hockey Association's All-Conference Second Team and Mercyhurst's Top Defenseman.

In his final year with the Mercyhurst Lakers, he had a break out season. Duszak led the team with 16 goals and recorded his first career hat trick in a 4–3 win over the Holy Cross Crusaders. With his assistance, the Mercyhurst Lakers jumped from sixth in the conference to fourth. He led all the Atlantic Hockey conference defenseman in points and tied for the league lead in points and assists. As a result, he was named the Atlantic Hockey Player of the Year and Atlantic Hockey Best Defenseman. Duszak was also nominated for the Hobey Baker Award as the top National Collegiate Athletic Association men's ice hockey player and selected for the AHCA All-America Second Team. He was also named to the All-Atlantic Hockey First Team. As a result of his play, the Toronto Maple Leafs signed Duszak to a two-year entry-level contract.

Professional 
On May 3, 2019, Duszak recorded his first career AHL goal in a win over the Cleveland Monsters. In June 2019, Duszak was invited to the Toronto Maple Leafs Development Camp. After attending the Maple Leafs training camp, he was reassigned to the Toronto Marlies for the 2019–20 season. He subsequently joined their ECHL team, the Newfoundland Growlers, for their training camp and made their opening night roster. On November 12, he was recalled to the AHL but demoted shortly thereafter.

On August 30, 2022, Duszak signed a one year contract with HC Dinamo Minsk of the KHL after failing to make the Leafs during his 3 year tenure in the Leafs organization.

Career statistics

Awards and honors

References

External links 

1997 births
Living people
AHCA Division I men's ice hockey All-Americans
American men's ice hockey defensemen
Chicago Steel players
HC Dinamo Minsk players
People from Franklin Square, New York
Mercyhurst Lakers men's ice hockey players
Newfoundland Growlers players
Toronto Marlies players